In statistics, the displaced Poisson, also known as the hyper-Poisson distribution, is a generalization of the Poisson distribution.
The probability mass function is

where  and r is a new parameter; the Poisson distribution is recovered at r = 0.  Here  is the Pearson's incomplete gamma function:

where s is the integral part of r. 

References

Discrete distributions